Humbert Camerlo (18 December 1943 – 24 July 2020) was a French opera director.

Career

Directed Productions
Bluebeard's Castle (1964, 1967, 1980)
Symphonie de danse (1966)
Erwartung (1967, 1968, 1969, 1980)
Die glückliche Hand (1968)
Begleitungsmusik zu einer Lichtspielscene (1968, 1969)
A Survivor from Warsaw (1969)
The Rake's Progress (1969)
Lohengrin (1969)
Tannhäuser (1969)
Carmen (1969)
The Gypsy Baron (1969)
Tosca (1970)
Dialogues of the Carmelites (1970)
Mireille (1970)
L'heure espagnole (1970)
Les Espagnols à Venise (1970, 1985)
Ciboulette (1970)
The Merry Widow (1971)
The Me Nobody Knows (1971)
Cami-Camerlo (1971)
La fille de Madame Angot (1972)
Eugene Onegin (1975)
Pagliacci (1976)
Intégrale Erik Satie (1978)
Der Jahreslauf (1979)
Hommage à Picasso (1981)
L'elisir d'amore (1981)
The Marriage of Figaro (1983)
Mavra (1984, 2001)
Don Pasquale (1985)
The Breasts of Tiresias (1986)
Simon Boccanegra (1991)
Édredon ler, roi de la lune (1993)
Attila (2002)
La Farce de maître Pathelin (2002, 2003)

References

1943 births
2020 deaths
French opera directors
People from Villeurbanne